Capital Style magazine was a Washington, DC political lifestyle magazine in publication from October 1997 to May 2000. Its editor was Bill Thomas. Capital Style was launched by The Economist Group.
The Capital Style feature that received the most attention was "Bill Clinton Hit on My Wife" by humorist Steve Altes.

References

1997 establishments in Washington, D.C.
2000 disestablishments in Washington, D.C.
Defunct political magazines published in the United States
Lifestyle magazines published in the United States
Magazines established in 1997
Magazines disestablished in 2000
Magazines published in Washington, D.C.